Displeased Records was a Dutch independent record label, founded by Lars Eikema and Ron Veltkamp. The label had many Dutch and other extreme metal bands on its roster, but has also re-released albums by Agathocles, Cryptopsy, Infernäl Mäjesty, Sadus, Toxik and Whiplash. The label also had a large mail order division called Discorder.com.

History
Displeased Records was founded in 1992 by Lars Eikema and Ron Veltkamp. In the beginning the main focus was to release compilation CDs from unknown/unsigned artists playing all types of heavy metal, like death metal, thrash metal, etc. After a distribution network was set up Displeased Records started releasing studio albums of metal acts like Nembrionic, Altar, Hybernoid and Celestial Season. In the same period a mail order business was erected, in the beginning under the same moniker of the label name, later changed to Dis-order (a combination of DISpleased and mailORDER). Since 2011, the name was changed to Discorder.

From the second half of the 90s, Displeased Records licensed cult thrash metal albums from Roadrunner Records, from bands like Infernäl Mäjesty, Pestilence, Whiplash, Toxik and Sadus.

A distribution service was present from the beginning, albeit very small. Later on more and more music shops were provided with the metal albums and shirts that were already sold through the mail order.

In April 2018, Displeased Records went bankrupt.

Artists

 Acheron
 Altar
 Bunkur
 Celestial Season
 Consolation
 Cryptopsy
 Dead Head
 Eternal Solstice
 Even Song
 Goat Semen
 Hades
 Hellwitch
 Houwitser
 Hybernoid
 Infinited Hate
 Manegarm
 Nembrionic
 Nocturnal
 Officium Triste
 Sadist
 Sadus
 Striborg
 Toxik
 Unlord
 Vesperian Sorrow
 Whiplash

References

External links
 

Heavy metal record labels
Black metal record labels
Doom metal record labels
Grindcore record labels
Record labels established in 1992
Dutch independent record labels
Death metal record labels
Thrash metal record labels
Retail companies of the Netherlands
Record labels disestablished in 2018